Jumog Waterfall, at Ngargoyoso, Karanganyar Regency, is one of the sites included in the Indonesian tourism program, "INTANPARI" (Industri Pertanian Pariwisata). The waterfall is named after the hill it is on, and stands approximately 12 meters tall.

References

Waterfalls of Java
Landforms of Central Java